Zahid Ali Pirzada (born 1 May 1973) is a Pakistani rower. He competed in the men's lightweight double sculls event at the 2000 Summer Olympics.

References

1973 births
Living people
Pakistani male rowers
Olympic rowers of Pakistan
Rowers at the 2000 Summer Olympics
People from Naushahro Feroze District
Rowers at the 1998 Asian Games
Asian Games competitors for Pakistan
20th-century Pakistani people